Sand Springs is an unincorporated rural hamlet in southwestern Garfield County, Montana, United States. It lies along the northern side of Highway 200, southwest of the town of Jordan, the county seat of Garfield County. Its elevation is 3,192 feet (973 m).
It has a population of approximately nine people.

The hamlet has a post office serving ZIP code 59077, which opened on March 1, 1911 and which now shares building space with a small store, with gas pump. There is also a church that has a service every other Sunday. It is the location of the annual Christmas program put on by the school. Sand Springs School is a one-room schoolhouse that serves kindergarten through eighth grade. There are also three residences.

Sand Springs is over 100 years old, founded at the turn of the 20th century by sheep, cattle, and horse ranchers.  It takes its name from the wide expanse of sandy soil and life-giving springs in the area. Most people served by the town make a living as ranchers and farmers. The arable acres in this area are some of the richest, most productive soils in the county; however, much of the land is suitable only for grazing due to the terrain. Near the town, there is a family-owned reservoir that is open to the public for fishing. The economy is also supported by recreation - there is excellent hunting, fishing, and camping opportunities available all year round; the Fish, Wildlife, and Parks station is located in the center of town. The football team of the school won the state championship in 2017.

Climate
According to the Köppen Climate Classification system, Sand Springs has a semi-arid climate, abbreviated "BSk" on climate maps.

References

Unincorporated communities in Garfield County, Montana
Unincorporated communities in Montana